White Nile is one of the 18 wilayat or states of Sudan. It has an area of 39,701 km2 and an estimated population of approximately 1,140,694 (2008). Since 1994 Rabak is the capital of the state; other important cities include Kosti and Ed Dueim.

The state is administratively subdivided into four districts:
Ad Douiem
Al Gutaina
Kosti
Al Jabalian

References

 
States of Sudan